Muesli belt malnutrition is a term coined by Professor Vincent Marks, author of the book Panic Nation, to describe the supposed phenomenon that parents feeding their children what is seen as an "extremely healthy" diet (the term muesli is possibly derisively used here as an exemplar of healthy food) could be depriving their children of essential fats.

A study carried out at Bristol University examining the diets of British toddlers found that such fears were overstated.  The study found that while children in the lowest fat group had lower intakes of zinc and vitamin A, children in the highest fat group ingested less iron and vitamin C. Overall the children were not seriously deprived of any essential nutrients, regardless of their diets.

See also 
 Muesli
 Orthorexia
 Raw foodism

References 

Infant feeding
Malnutrition
Diets